Desert sand is a very light and very weakly saturated reddish yellow colour which corresponds specifically to the coloration of sand. It may also be regarded as a deep tone of beige.

Desert sand was used by General Motors, along with "rosewood", as a paint color for their early Cadillacs.

In 1998, desert sand was made into a Crayola crayon colour.

The color shown at right matches the palest of the three colors in the 3-color Desert Camouflage Uniform of United States Armed Forces, which in 1990 began to replace the 6-color Desert Battle Dress Uniform.

Six Color Variations of Desert Sand

Sandy brown

The web color sandy brown is displayed at right.

As its name suggests, sandy brown is a shade of brown which is similar to the color of some sands.

Earth yellow

The color earth yellow is displayed at right. 

Earth yellow is one of the twelve official camouflage colors of the United States Army.

Sand

Sand is a color that resembles the color of beach sand. In fact, another name for this color is beach, an alternate color name in use for this color since 1923.

The first recorded use of sand as a color name in English was in 1627.

The normalized color coordinates for sand are identical to ecru, which was first recorded as a color name in English in 1836.

The San Diego Padres of Major League Baseball currently use Sand as one of their team colors.

Desert

Desert is a color that resembles the color of the flat areas of a desert. 

The first recorded use of desert as a color name in English was in 1920.

The normalized color coordinates for desert are identical to fallow, wood brown and camel, which were first recorded as color names in English in 1000, 1886, and 1916, respectively.

Sand dune (Drab)

Sand dune is a color that resembles the color of a sand dune composed of dark colored sand.

The first recorded use of sand dune as a color name in English was in 1925.

The normalized color coordinates for sand dune are identical to the color names drab, mode beige and bistre brown, which were first recorded as color names in English, respectively, in 1686, 1928, and 1930.

Field drab

The color field drab is displayed at right. 

Field drab is one of the twelve official camouflage colors of the United States Army.

Desert sand in human culture
Fashion
 Earth yellow is a popular color for women’s handbags.

Interior design
 The tones of desert sand are called desert colors because they suggest the colors of the landscape of and of the design of the Native American cultures of the Southwestern United States. The desert colors are widely used (with both tones of sky blue or turquoise and tones of maroon to complement them) in Southwest Design.
Military
 The colors desert sand, earth yellow, sand, and field drab are all on the list of the twelve standard camouflage colors used by the United States Department of the Army.

Notes

References

Bibliography

Citations

See also
 List of colors

Shades of brown